The Brattle Group provides consulting services and expert testimony in economics, finance, and regulation to corporations, law firms, and public agencies. As of 2019, the company had offices in Boston, Brussels, Chicago, London, Madrid, New York City, Rome, San Francisco, Sydney, Toronto, and Washington, DC. Headquartered in Boston since 2017, its original headquarters was located on Brattle Street, in the Harvard Square district of Cambridge.

Brattle Prize in Corporate Finance
The company presents the Brattle Prize each year at the American Finance Association's annual meeting. It is awarded for outstanding papers on corporate finance, published in the Journal of Finance.

Consultants
Daniel McFadden
Stewart Myers
George S. Oldfield

References

Consulting firms established in 1990
1990 establishments in Massachusetts
American companies established in 1990